A Death in the Family is an autobiographical novel by James Agee. It was based on events which occurred to Agee in 1915, when his father went out of town to see his own father, who had suffered a heart attack. During the return trip, Agee's father was killed in a car accident.

Premise
The novel provides a portrait of life in Knoxville, Tennessee, showing how such a loss affects the young widow, her two children, her atheist father and the deceased alcoholic brother.

Background
Agee commenced the work in 1948. It was incomplete at the time of his death in 1955. Reputedly, many portions had been written in the home of his friend Frances Wickes). It was edited and released posthumously in 1957 by editor David McDowell. Agee's widow and children were left with little money after Agee's death and McDowell wanted to help them by publishing the work. Agee won the Pulitzer Prize for Fiction in 1958 for the novel. The novel was included on Time 2005 list of the 100 best English-language novels written since 1923.

Earlier draft

University of Tennessee professor Michael Lofaro maintains that the novel as published 1957 was not the version intended for print by the author. Lafro discussed his work at a conference that was part of the Knoxville James Agee Celebration (April 2005). Having tracked down the author's original manuscripts and notes, Lafaro reconstructed a version he considers more authentic. This version, entitled A Death in the Family: A Restoration of the Author's Text, was published in 2007 as part of the 10-volume set The Collected Works of James Agee (University of Tennessee Press). Lofaro is also the author of Agee Agonistes: Essays on the Life, Legend, and Works of James Agee (2007).

According to Lofaro, McDowell's alterations include: 

 The removal of the original opening, a nightmare scene, and its substitution with "Knoxville: Summer of 1915," a previously published short work of Agee's that was not intended as part of the novel.
 A reordering of the presentation of events, which were originally shown in chronological order. 
 Chapters were removed.
 Chapters were divided. 
 Certain chapters were moved and presented as flashbacks.
 The number of chapters was changed from forty-four short chapters to twenty.

Adaptations
The novel was adapted into All the Way Home by Tad Mosel. The play won a 1961 Pulitzer Prize.

A film entitled All The Way Home (1963) was adapted by Philip H. Reisman, Jr. from the Agee novel and the Mosel play. It was filmed in the same  Knoxville neighborhood where Agee grew up. 

A live version of the play aired on television in 1981 starring Sally Field and William Hurt. It was broadcast live on NBC from the Bing Theatre on the campus of the University of Southern California.

A TV movie adaptation filmed in Tennessee and starring Annabeth Gish, aired on PBS in 2002.

Samuel Barber wrote Knoxville: Summer of 1915 (1947, revised 1950) on commission from the American soprano Eleanor Steber, who had asked for a work for soprano with orchestra.

William Mayer wrote an opera based on the novel; it premiered in 1983.

Knoxville the musical (2022) written by Lynn Ahrens and Stephen Flaherty, is a "universal coming-of-age story about family, faith and love—and the boy who will grow up to write it. With a sweeping musical score blending folk, bluegrass and ballads." Two-time Tony winner Frank Galati adapted Knoxville's book and directed the musical. Knoxville was in rehearsals for its world premiere at the Asolo Repertory Theater in Sarasota, FL but was forced to stop because of the pandemic. It came to the stage as part of their 2021-2022 season in April to May 2022.

References

Further reading 

Paul F. Brown, Rufus: James Agee in Tennessee, Knoxville: University of Tennessee Press (2018), 422 pages. .
Kenneth Curry, "The Knoxville of James Agee's A Death in the Family," Tennessee Studies in Literature XIV (1969), Knoxville: University of Tennessee Press, pp. 1–14.

External links
 Photos of the first edition of A Death in the Family

1957 American novels
2007 American novels
Pulitzer Prize for Fiction-winning works
American autobiographical novels
American novels adapted into films
Culture of Knoxville, Tennessee
American novels adapted into plays
Novels set in Appalachia
Novels set in East Tennessee
Fiction set in 1915
Novels published posthumously
Novels about death
Novels adapted into operas